The 1980 All-Pro Team is composed of the National Football League players that were named to the Associated Press, Newspaper Enterprise Association, Pro Football Writers Association, Pro Football Weekly, and The Sporting News All-Pro Teams in 1980. Both first- and second- teams are listed for the AP and NEA teams. These are the five teams that are included in Total Football II: The Official Encyclopedia of the National Football League.  Pro Football Weekly chose a nose tackle due to the proliferation of 3-4 defenses in the NFL. They, and The Sporting News chose two inside linebackers.

Teams

Key
 AP = Associated Press first-team All-Pro
 AP-2 = Associated Press second-team All-Pro
 NEA = Newspaper Enterprise Association first-team All-Pro team
 NEA-2 = Newspaper Enterprise Association second-team All-Pro team
 PFW = Pro Football Weekly All-Pro team
 PFWA = Pro Football Writers Association All-NFL
 TSN = The Sporting News All-Pro

References

All-Pro Teams
Allpro